Joseph Romeo Steve Penney (born February 7, 1961) is a Canadian former professional ice hockey goaltender. Penney played with the Montreal Canadiens and original Winnipeg Jets of the National Hockey League.

Early life
Penney was born in Sainte-Foy, Quebec. As a youth, he played in the 1974 Quebec International Pee-Wee Hockey Tournament with a minor ice hockey team from Sainte-Foy.

Career 
Penney made his NHL debut with a handful of games left in the 1983-84 NHL season when Canadiens coach Jacques Lemaire, dissatisfied with the play of regular goaltending tandem Rick Wamsley and Richard Sevigny, called up the 23-year-old Penney from the AHL and made him the starting goaltender for the 1984 Stanley Cup playoffs. Penney was an immediate sensation, posting three shutouts as Montreal upset both the Boston Bruins and Quebec Nordiques to reach the Wales Conference final against the 4-time defending Stanley Cup champion New York Islanders. Montreal won the first two games but the Islanders swept the next four to advance to their fifth straight Stanley Cup final.

Penney won a Stanley Cup with the 1986 Canadiens. Due to a season-ending injury in January of that season, Penney only played 18 games, and his name was left off the Stanley Cup, even though he qualified due to an injury exemption. In a deep bit of irony, his replacement was another young native of Sainte-Foy who caught fire during the playoffs, as 20-year-old Patrick Roy took over in the nets and led Montreal to the Stanley Cup championship. Penney was traded that offseason to Winnipeg for Brian Hayward. Montreal did include Penney on the team picture, and gave him a Stanley Cup ring. He was also named to the NHL All-Rookie Team in 1984–85.

Career statistics

References

External links

1961 births
Living people
Anglophone Quebec people
Canadian ice hockey goaltenders
Flint Generals players
Ice hockey people from Quebec City
Moncton Hawks players
Montreal Canadiens draft picks
Montreal Canadiens players
Nova Scotia Voyageurs players
People from Sainte-Foy, Quebec City
Shawinigan Cataractes players
Sherbrooke Canadiens players
Stanley Cup champions
Winnipeg Jets (1979–1996) players